Anne of Little Smoky is a 1921 American silent romantic drama film directed by Edward Connor and starring Winifred Westover, Dolores Cassinelli, Joe King, Frank Hagney, and Ralph Faulkner. The film was released by Playgoers Pictures on November 20, 1921.

Plot
Set in the Kentucky mountains. The Brockton family consider Little Smoky to be their mountain, but the government declares it to be a forest and game preserve. Forest ranger Bob Hayne is in love with Anne Brockton, but when he catches her father, Ed, poaching game he tries to arrest him. The two men fight, and Brockton is believed to have died. When bloodhounds are set on Bob’s trail Anne dresses in some of his clothing in an attempt to confuse the hounds following his scent. Anne finds her father alive in the forest ranger’s cabin.

Meanwhile Gita, a gypsy girl, is attacked by a renegade Indian. Anne’s brother Tom, who suffered shell-shock during the first World War, rescues Gita. The incident brings Tom back to his senses.

Ed Brockton becomes friends with Bob, and allows him to court Anne. Tom and Gita fall in love, and both couples look forward to a happy future.

Cast
Winifred Westover as Anne
Dolores Cassinelli as Gita
Joe King as Bob Hayne
Frank Hagney as Ed Brockton
Ralph Faulkner as Tom Brockton
Harold Callahan as Buddy
Alice Chapin as Mrs. Brockton
Frank Sheridan as The Brockton
Edward Roseman as Sam Ward

Preservation
Anne of Little Smoky is now considered lost.

References

External links

1921 romantic drama films
American romantic drama films
1921 films
American silent feature films
American black-and-white films
Lost American films
Lost romantic drama films
1921 lost films
1920s American films
Silent romantic drama films
Silent American drama films